The Ara Pacis Augustae (Latin, "Altar of Augustan Peace"; commonly shortened to Ara Pacis) is an altar in Rome dedicated to Pax Romana. The monument was commissioned by the Roman Senate on July 4, 13 BC to honour the return of Augustus to Rome after three years in Hispania and Gaul and consecrated on January 30, 9 BC. Originally located on the northern outskirts of Rome, a Roman mile from the boundary of the pomerium on the west side of the Via Flaminia, the Ara Pacis stood in the northeastern corner of the Campus Martius, the former flood plain of the Tiber River and gradually became buried under  of silt deposits. It was reassembled in its current location, now the Museum of the Ara Pacis, in 1938, turned 90° counterclockwise from its original orientation so that the original western side now faces south.

Significance

The altar reflects the Augustan vision of Roman civil religion. The lower register of its frieze depicts agricultural work meant to communicate the abundance and prosperity of the Roman Peace. The monument as a whole serves a dual civic ritual and propaganda function for Augustus and his regime, easing notions of autocracy and dynastic succession that might otherwise be unpalatable to traditional Roman culture.

Structure

The monument consists of a traditional open-air altar at its centre surrounded by precinct walls which are pierced on the eastern and western ends (so called today because of the modern layout) by openings and elaborately and finely sculpted entirely in Luna marble.

The altar
Within the enclosing precinct walls, the altar itself was carved with images illustrating the lex aria, the law governing the ritual performed at the altar.  The sacrificial procession depicts animals being led to sacrifice by figures carved in a Republican style similar to the so-called "Altar of Domitius Ahenobarbus", in sharp contrast with the style on the exterior of the precinct walls.  What remains of the altar is otherwise fragmentary, but it appears to have been largely functional with less emphasis on art and decoration.

The interior of the precinct walls are carved with bucrania, ox skulls, from which carved garlands hang.  The garlands bear fruits from various types of plants, all displayed on a single garland as allegorical representations of plenty and abundance.  The bucrania in turn evoke the idea of sacrificial piety, appropriate motifs for the interior of the altar precinct. The lower register of the interior walls imitate the appearance of traditionally wooden altar precincts, which were meant to bring to mind other such altars in Rome and the tradition of constructing altars at the boundary of the city's pomerium.

Exterior wall decoration

The exterior walls of the Ara Pacis are divided between allegorical and pseudo-historical relief panels on the upper register while the lower register comprises scenes of nature: harmonic, intertwined vines that contain wildlife and connote nature under control.  The upper register of the northern and southern walls depict scenes of the emperor, his family, and members of the regime in the act of processing to or performing a sacrifice.  Various figures in togas are shown with their heads covered (capite velato), signifying their role as both priests and sacrificiants.  Other figures wear laurel crowns, traditional Roman symbols of victory.  Members of individual priestly colleges are depicted in traditional garb appropriate to their office, while lictors can be identified by their iconographic fasces.  Women and children are also included among the procession; the depiction of children in Roman sculpture would have been novel at the time of the Altar's construction, evoking themes of moral and familial piety, as well as easing concerns over dynastic intentions while simultaneously introducing potential heirs to the public eye. However, despite the emphasis on family values, the anonymity of many of the women depicted enforces the male retention of power within this new age of peace.

The western and eastern walls are both pierced by entryways to the altar, although the interior would only have been accessed by a stairway on the western side.  The entryways were flanked by panels depicting allegorical or mythological scenes evocative of peace, piety and tradition.  On the eastern wall, panels depicted the seated figures of Roma and Pax, while the western side depicts the discovery of the twins and she-wolf and the sacrifice of a figure traditionally identified as Aeneas, but increasingly believed to be Rome's second king, Numa Pompilius. The identity of these various figures has been a point of some controversy over the years, relying heavily on interpretation of fragmentary remains, discussed below.

The sculpture of the Ara Pacis is primarily symbolic rather than decorative, and its iconography has several levels of significance. Studies of the Ara Pacis and similar public Roman monuments traditionally address the potent political symbolism of their decorative programs, and their emphasis and promulgation of dynastic and other imperial policies; they are usually studied as a form of imperial propaganda. The Ara Pacis is seen to embody without conscious effort the deep-rooted ideological connections among cosmic sovereignty, military force, and fertility that were first outlined by Georges Dumézil, connections which are attested in early Roman culture and more broadly in the substructure of Indo-European culture at large. Peter Holliday suggested that the Altar's imagery of the Golden Age, usually discussed as mere poetic allusion, appealed to a significant component of the Roman populace. The program of the Ara Pacis addressed this group's very real fears of cyclical history, and promised that the rule of Augustus would avert the cataclysmic destruction of the world predicted by contemporary models of historical thought.

The east and west walls

The East and West walls each contain two panels, one well preserved and one represented only in fragments.

The East Wall contains a badly preserved scene of a female warrior, possibly Roma, apparently sitting on a pile of weapons confiscated from the enemy (war trophy), thus forcing peace upon them by rendering them unable to make war. This scene has been reconstructed, based on coins that depict such a seated Roma. When the monument was being reconstructed at its present site,  Edmund Buchner and other scholars sketched what the panel may have looked like. This interpretation, although widely accepted, can not be proved correct, as so little of the original panel survives.

The other panel is more controversial in its subject, but far better preserved. A goddess sits amid a scene of fertility and prosperity with twins on her lap. Scholars have variously suggested that the goddess is Italia, Tellus (Earth), Venus Genetrix or Pax (Peace), although other views also circulate. Due to the widespread depiction around the sculpture of scenes of peace, and because the altar is named for "peace", the favoured conclusion is that the goddess is Pax.

The West Wall also contains two panels. The fragmentary "Lupercal Panel" apparently preserves the moment when Romulus and Remus were discovered by Faustulus the shepherd, while Mars looks on.  Again this panel is a modern drawing without much evidence.  Marble fragments of the tree and the head and shoulder of Mars (if it is Mars) and part of a second individual (thought to be Faustulus) survive, but the addition of the she-wolf, Romulus, and Remus is entirely speculative.

The better preserved scene depicts the sacrifice of a pig (the standard sacrifice when Romans made a peace treaty) by an old priest and two attendants.  In 1907, this scene was identified by Johannes Sieveking as the moment when Aeneas, newly arrived in Italy, sacrificed a sow and her 30 piglets to Juno, as told by Virgil and others, even though the scene differs greatly from Vergil's description. In the 1960s, Stephan Weinstock challenged this identification (and the very identity of the entire monument), citing numerous discrepancies that Sieveking and his followers had failed to notice between Vergil's version and the panel. Subsequently, the suggestion was made that the scene shows Numa Pompilius, the Roman king associated with Peace and the Gates of Janus.  Paul Rehak later published an article with this proposal, confirmed in a chapter of his posthumous book.  This theory has won over many scholars, despite considerable initial resistance.

The figures

The long friezes of the Ara Pacis (the North and South Walls) contain figures advancing towards the West, who participate in a state of thanksgiving to celebrate the Peace created by Augustus.  These figures fall into four categories: lictors (men carrying fasces, bodyguards of magistrates); priests (three of the four major collegia – Pontifices, Septemviri, and Quindecimviri): women and children (generally from the imperial family, represented in portraiture); and attendants (a few anonymous figures necessary for religious purposes).

In addition there are two or three non-Roman children, who may be guests (or hostages) in Rome. Their identification by their non-Roman costume and their participation in the ceremony advertises to all that Rome is the centre of the world, and that other nations send their young to Rome to learn Roman ways, so great is Rome's reputation. The ceremony took place in the summer of 13 BC, but not necessarily on 4 July, when the Senate voted to build the Ara Pacis.

North wall
The north wall has about 46 extant or partially extant figures. The first two foreground figures are lictors, carrying fasces (bundles of rods symbolizing Roman authority). The next set of figures consists of priests from the college of the Septemviri epulones, so identified by an incense box they carry with special symbols. One member of this college is missing in a gap.

After them follows the collegium of the quindecimviri sacris faciundis, also identified by the incense box carried by a public slave among them.  Although the name suggests this college has exactly fifteen members, the size of the college has grown to 23, including Augustus and Agrippa, who appear on the South Frieze.  The other twenty-one members are present here.  Two very badly damaged figures in the middle are split by a gap.  From photos, the gap appears to affect a single figure, but as Koeppel, Conlin, and Stern have proven, in-site examination reveals that one is a foreground and the other a background figure.

The last portion of the North Frieze consists of members of the imperial family.  Many scholars used to identify the veiled, leading figure as Julia, daughter of Augustus,  but since Julia appears on the South Frieze, it is more likely that this figure is Octavia Minor.  Other figures in the entourage might include Marcella Major (a daughter of Octavia), Iullus Antonius (a son of Mark Antony), and two boys and a girl of the imperial family.

In 1894, and again in 1902 and 1903, Eugen Petersen suggested that Lucius Caesar appears with Agrippa, dressed in a "Trojan" costume for the Troy Game held in 13 BC (see below).  Many scholars, realizing by 1935 that Lucius was too young to be the boy beside Agrippa, preferred to identify him as Gaius.  They named the smallest child on the North Frieze "Lucius," even though he is a mere toddler (Lucius was four in 13 BC).  Some scholars assumed this boy also was a participant in the Troy Games, although he is certainly too young (six or seven was the minimum age).  If this toddler were Lucius, he would be too young and in the wrong costume for the Troy Games.  The best guess is that he is a Germanic tribal prince, but he is certainly not a dressed as a Trojan.  As Charles Brian Rose has noted, "The variable value of the Eastern costume and the uneasy interaction of Trojan and Parthian iconography can make it difficult to determine whether one is viewing the founders of the Romans or their fiercest opponents."

The youth wearing Hellenistic Greek clothing suited to a Hellenistic prince has been identified as Gaius in the guise of a camillus, an adolescent attendant of the Flamen Dialis. The Gaius identification is best supported by his size, however an additional boy in Roman dress who has a bulla (but has lost his head) is also the right size, and therefore a better guess.  For Gaius to appear in public without his bulla would invite the evil eye.  This same figure in Hellenistic dress has also been interpreted as Ptolemy of Mauretania representing Africa, along with the German boy (Europe) and the Parthian prince (Asia).  A foreign prince would not wear a bulla.

South wall

The South Wall has seen a great deal of scholarship and the greatest number of academic debates.  Unlike the North Wall, where most of the heads are new (not authentic ancient heads, but modern creations), the heads of the figures on the South Wall are mostly original.  Some half dozen figures are recognizable from looking at other surviving statues of members of the imperial family.  Nevertheless, much debate has taken place over many of these figures, including Augustus, Agrippa, Tiberius, Julia, and Antonia.

The figure of Augustus was not discovered until the 1903 excavation, and his head was damaged by the cornerstone of the Renaissance palazzo built on top of the original Ara Pacis site. Although he was identified correctly in 1903, Petersen, Strong, and Stuart-Jones initially saw the figure as the rex sacrorum.  Today Augustus is better recognized by his hair style than his face.

In the absence of Augustus from the panel, early scholars debated whether Agrippa (the tall veiled priest) was Augustus or Agrippa or Lepidus. In 1907, Sieveking proposed that this figure was Lepidus, the Pontifex Maximus in 13 BC. Sieveking later reversed his position with a series of peculiar suggestions. In 1926, Loewy compared the Ara Pacis Agrippa to the Louvre Agrippa and the Agrippa in Copenhagen (and elsewhere) in order to demonstrate the iconographical similarity.  Aside from a very small minority of scholars (most vehemently defensive of Lepidus in Rom. Mitt in the 1930s was Ludwig Curtius), the rest of the academy concluded that this figure is Agrippa. Ryberg's 1949 article gave further weight to that conclusion.

Many scholars continue to see the Julia figure as Livia, having reasoned that Livia has to be on the Ara Pacis. Indeed, Livia does appear somewhere (her exclusion is unlikely), but by 13 BC Julia had politically eclipsed Livia, as has been understood and explained by many scholars. The identification dates back to Milani in 1891.  Furthermore, Livia has no bond to Agrippa, whereas Julia was his wife and expected to be the unofficial empress of Rome for decades, during and beyond Augustus' lifetime.  Julia also better personified Augustus' new pro-natalism program, having already given birth to four surviving children (and was pregnant with a fifth).  Surprisingly, a majority of scholars in 2000 preferred to see this figure as Livia.

The Tiberius figure was identified as such by Milani, an identification that was rarely questioned until the 1940s. Moretti, in making the glass museum for the Ara Pacis at Mussolini's command, guessed that the two consuls (Tiberius and Varus) of 13 flank Augustus, so he saw this figure as M. Valerius Messalla. V. H. von Poulsen and Toynbee proposed Iullus Antonius.  But as has been well established, Augustus is flanked by priests, and this figure is Tiberius.  Boschung and Bonanno have both matched the face to early period Tiberius statuary.

In relation to Antonia, Drusus, and Germanicus, H. Dütschke proposed in 1880 the correct identity for Antonia and Drusus, but incorrectly saw the toddler as Claudius. A. von Domaszewski amended this family identification and correctly saw the child as Germanicus.  He also suggested that the Ara Pacis is arranged in family groups.  He correctly determined that the two-year-old child could be only Germanicus, whose exact birth on 24 May 15 BC is known.  This helps prove that the ceremony is an event in 13, although a few scholars continued to argue the ceremony was that of 9 BC (until definitive proof in favor of 13 came out in 1939).

In relation to the Domitii Ahenobarbi, von Domaszewski also proposed in the same 1903 article that the last family on the South Wall is that of the father of the emperor Nero (born Lucius Domitius Ahenobarbus).  This identification remains widespread today. John Pollini provides the best summary of this viewpoint in his article, "Ahenobarbi, Appuleii and Some Others on the Ara Pacis", where he points out that the writer Suetonius specifically mentions that Nero's father went "to the East on the staff of the young Gaius Caesar". As this campaign is known to have begun in 2 BC, it means that Gnaeus must have been of mature age by that time, therefore requiring a birth year of at least 17 BC, which would, in turn, make him sufficiently old to be the boy on the Ara Pacis.  Pollini also reasons that the delay in Gnaeus' career (only reaching the consulship in 32 AD) resulted from his documented unpleasant character and points out that the careers of other members of the family with undesirable traits also suffered similar delays, notably Augustus' youngest grandson, Agrippa Postumus, who had no career, and Germanicus' brother, the later emperor, Claudius, whose career started late.   However, there are some dissenters from this theory.  Stern claims that these figures cannot possibly be the Domitii Ahenobarbi, on the basis of the belief that Gnaeus Domitius Ahenobarbus, whom von Domaszewski saw as the boy of the family, was born after the monument's completion. Syme had also argued that Gnaeus was born after the monument's completion, but accepted the identification of the Ahenobarbus family, preferring to identify the boy as an otherwise unknown elder brother and the girl figure as an otherwise unknown elder sister of Gnaeus—both of whom died young.  Syme also proved somewhat unintentionally, based on the inscription ILS 6095 that Lucius Domitius Ahenobarbus was governor of Africa in 13 BC and could not be in Rome for the Ara Pacis ceremony.

Starting in 1894, Eugen Petersen suggested that Lucius Caesar appears between Augustus (this veiled figure is actually Agrippa) and Livia (actually Julia).  Petersen had a good idea about families grouping together, but he identified none of the figures correctly in this place.  In the 1920s as more and more scholars decided the scene dates to 13 BC, Loewy proposed that Lucius was too young to be this boy.  After Loewy's 1926 article, consensus shifted to Gaius Caesar.  Gaius, seven years old in 13 BC, fit better.  Moretti canonized that Gaius was dressed in a "Trojan" costume for the equestrian boys event called the Troy Game, which was held in 13 or possibly 11 BC for the dedication of the Theater of Marcellus. This theory won universal acceptance for many decades, even though the evidence is overwhelmingly against.  The boy is clearly not a Roman, given his clothing, lack of bulla, and hair style.  So ingrained was Petersen's theory, however, that when the distinguished scholar Erika Simon (1968, 18) suggested the boy is a barbarian, she was subjected to intense criticism until she retracted.  Subsequently, led by Charles Brian Rose and Ann Kuttner, North American scholars have realized Petersen was wrong:  the boy is a foreign prince.  Stern adds the costume is wrong for a Trojan (no Phrygian hat) and no bulla – worn by all Roman boys as protection from the evil eye.  Many others have contributed to disprove Petersen's theory.

Excavation and conservation
 

 In 1568, the first fragmentary sculptures were rediscovered beneath Palazzo Peretti in Lucina  (a.k.a. Palazzo Fano-Almagià), right next to the basilica San Lorenzo in Lucina, close to "Via del Corso", and have found their way to the Villa Medici, the Vatican, the Uffizi and the Louvre.
 In 1859 further sculptural fragments were found in the same area under the Teatro Olimpia, part of the Peretti Palace in via in Lucina, close to the Italian Parliament Building, and the sculptures were recognized as having belonged to the same monument.
 In 1903, well after Friedrich von Duhn had recognized that the reliefs belonged to the Ara Pacis (1879–81), known from Augustus' memoir, a request was sent to the Ministry of Public Education to continue the excavations. Their success was made possible by the generosity of Edoardo Almagià, who, as well as giving his permission for the exploration, donated in advance whatever should be discovered underneath the palace and made an ongoing financial contribution to the expenses of the excavation; by July of that year, it became clear that the conditions were extremely difficult and that the stability of the Teatro Olimpia might well be compromised; when about half the monument had been examined and 53 fragments recovered, the excavation was called to a halt.
 In 1909 it was decided that several buildings closely surrounding the Mausoleum of Augustus were to be destroyed to bring the mausoleum back to view.
 Between 1918 and 1921 the President of the Piedmontese Society of Archaeology and Fine Arts, Oreste Mattirolo, for the first time suggested that all fragments were to be collected and joined to rebuild the altar.
 In 1932 demolition of buildings surrounding the mausoleum, decided in 1909, started, together with many other demolitions carried on in those years in the city.
 In February 1937, the Italian Cabinet decreed that for the 2000th anniversary of the birth of Augustus, the excavations should recommence, using the most advanced technology. Seventy cubic meters of ground under what was by then the Cinema Nuovo Olimpia were frozen, whilst the altar was extracted.
 The fragments, although not complete, were collected and joined to rebuild the Ara; due to the short time available (work had to be completed before 23 September 1938, the last day of the Augustan anniversary), few fragments available and poor historical sources to refer to for restoration (basically a couple of ancient Roman coins), the reconstruction had to be performed with the help of Italian artist Odoardo Ferretti.

The First Protective Building Housing the Monument by architect Vittorio Ballio Morpurgo 
In 1938 the finally reconstructed Ara was placed near the Mausoleum of Augustus, and a big pavilion was built around it by architect Vittorio Ballio Morpurgo as part of Benito Mussolini's attempt to create an ancient Roman "theme park" to glorify Fascist Italy. Several dozen buildings surrounding the Mausoleum were levelled to free up space around the monument. This led to a great number of complaints from locals, starting a long series of arguments and criticisms of the Ara Pacis project. These arguments are ongoing despite the original pavilion being replaced by a new one in 2006, known as the "Ara Pacis museum".

The New Protective Building Housing the Monument by architect Richard Meier 
The historic Fascist style building around the Altar, locally known as "teca del Morpurgo", was pulled down in 2006, and replaced by a glass and steel structure in modern style, designed by architect Richard Meier. The new cover building, which has been named "Ara Pacis museum", now stands on the same site as Mussolini's structure. This new structure is much bigger than the previous one and it is divided into multiple rooms and sections besides the main one containing the altar.

Meier's building construction caused new arguments and criticism, after the ones which accompanied the first building construction, both from Roman inhabitants and foreign observers, probably due both to political memory tied to the pre-existing pavilion and to the visual impact of the new pavilion, which in the opinion of many is in stark contrast with surrounding historical buildings.

Nicolai Ouroussoff, of The New York Times called the building "a contemporary expression of what can happen when an architect fetishizes his own style out of a sense of self-aggrandizement. Absurdly over-scale, it seems indifferent to the naked beauty of the dense and richly textured city around it."  Former mayor Gianni Alemanno, backed in July 2008 by culture undersecretary Francesco Maria Giro, pledged to tear down the new structure. He later changed his stance on the building and has agreed with Mr. Meier to modifications including drastically reducing the height of the wall between an open-air space outside the museum and a busy road along the Tiber river. The city plans to build a wide pedestrian area along the river and run the road underneath it. "It's an improvement," says Meier, adding that "the reason that wall was there has to do with traffic and noise. Once that is eliminated, the idea of opening the piazza to the river is a good one." The mayor's office said Alemanno hopes to complete the project before the end of his term in 2013.

Gallery of reliefs

See also

Naming of asteroid 
Imperial cult
List of Ancient Roman temples

References and notes

Bibliography
 
 
 
 
 
 
 
  Subscription required.

Further reading

Conlin, Diane Atnally 1997. The Artists of the Ara Pacis: The Process of Hellenization in Roman Relief Sculpture (Studies in the History of Greece and Rome University of North Carolina Press)
Peter J. Holliday, "Time, History, and Ritual on the Ara Pacis Augustae" The Art Bulletin 72.4 (December 1990:542-557) 
Rossini, Orietta 2006. Ara Pacis, Milan, Electa/.

External links
Official web site of the Ara Pacis Museum of Rome, English version
Comprehensive, high quality photo documentation of the Ara Pacis Augustae
 Samuel Ball Platner, A Topographical Dictionary of Ancient Rome: Ara Pacis
 Browser with high-quality images
 Several pages with photos of the sculpture
"Roman Power and Roman Imperial Sculpture"
Article from The New York Times, September 25 2006, "An Oracle of Modernism in Ancient Rome" by Nicolai Ouroussoff
Ara Pacis Bibliography annotated with links
 Moreno Maggi, A black and white photographic insight about Richard Meier's Ara Pacis in Rome
Ara Pacis photos
"Ara Pacis", Smarthistory essay by Dr. Jeffrey Becker.
High-resolution 360° Panoramas and Images of Ara Pacis | Art Atlas
 Riferimenti diretti all'Ara Pacis Augustae nelle fonti letterarie e iconografiche antiche. Una galleria, in “La Rivista di Engramma” n. 58 giugno/agosto 2007
Simona Dolari, Riscoperta e fortuna dei rilievi dell'Ara Pacis nell'età della Rinascita, in “La Rivista di Engramma” n. 75 ottobre/novembre 200 9
Simona Dolari, Ara Pacis 1938. Storia di una anastilosi difficile, in “La Rivista di Engramma” n. 75 ottobre/novembre 2009
Castriota, David, The Ara Pacis Augustae and the Imagery of Abundance in Later Greek and Early Roman Imperial Art, Princeton University Press, 1995, Bryn Mawr Classical Review 95.09.05, reviewed by Jas Elsner.

9 BC
1st-century BC religious buildings and structures
Augustan building projects
Tourist attractions in Rome
Ancient Roman buildings and structures in Rome
Roman altars
Augustan sculptures
Relocated buildings and structures
Augustus in Ancient Roman sculpture
Museum of the Ara Pacis
Marble buildings
Rome R. IV Campo Marzio
Campus Martius
She-wolf (Roman mythology)
Livia